Embedded Board eXpandable (EBX) is a standardized computer form factor.

This format was created for embedded computer systems by a consortium including Motorola and Ampro.  EBX systems typically were embedded PowerPC or PowerQUICC based.

It incorporates a PC/104-Plus connection subset for peripheral expansion. Optional connectors for PCMCIA are allowed.

References 
https://web.archive.org/web/20081228041905/http://www.pc104.org/ebx_specs.php

Embedded systems